Derek John Fatchett (22 August 1945 – 9 May 1999) was a British politician. He became Member of Parliament for Leeds Central in 1983 and was a member of the Labour Party. He was Minister of State for Foreign Affairs from 1997 to 1999.

Early life
Born in Lincoln, Lincolnshire, Fatchett was the son of a painter and decorator. His grandfather was a trade union official. He attended the all-male grammar school, Lincoln School and then the University of Birmingham where he studied Law, graduating in 1966. He joined the Labour Party in 1964. At the London School of Economics he took an MSc in 1968 where he joined in student demonstrations. He was more left-wing in his younger days in the 1960s and 1970s but moved towards the centre-left when an MP, leaving the Campaign Group in 1985.

Fatchett was a councillor on Wakefield Metropolitan Council from 1980 to 1984. He became a lecturer in Industrial Relations at the University of Leeds in 1971, staying there until he became an MP. He was selected as the candidate for the new constituency of Leeds Central over Stanley Cohen, who had held the predecessor constituency of Leeds South East, but had considered defecting from the Labour Party to the Social Democratic Party and was opposed by the left wing of the constituency party.

Parliamentary career
He contested the Bosworth seat in Leicestershire in 1979.

After Labour's 1997 election victory, he was made a Minister of State at the Foreign and Commonwealth Office with responsibility for the Middle East, North Africa and South Asia.

Two years later, whilst still in office, Fatchett died suddenly on the night of 9 May 1999, from a massive heart attack after collapsing whilst in a pub with his wife and a friend. The by-election for his seat was won by Hilary Benn.

Personal life
He married Anita Oakes in Birmingham on 12 April 1969 and had two sons, Brendan and Gareth. He lived in Wakefield.

External links
 Article on his life, BBC 1999
 Guardian Obituary
 By-election after his death

References

1945 births
1999 deaths
Academics of the University of Leeds
Alumni of the London School of Economics
Alumni of the University of Birmingham
Councillors in Wakefield
Labour Party (UK) MPs for English constituencies
Members of the Privy Council of the United Kingdom
People from Lincoln, England
UK MPs 1983–1987
UK MPs 1987–1992
UK MPs 1992–1997
UK MPs 1997–2001
People educated at Lincoln Grammar School